Roger Lee McCreary (born February 10, 2000) is an American football cornerback for the Tennessee Titans of the National Football League (NFL). He played college football at Auburn, where he was an All-American in 2021.

High school career
McCreary attended Williamson High School in Mobile, Alabama. Coming out of high school, McCreary was a 3 star prospect and was the 87th ranked cornerback. He committed to Auburn University to play college football after de-committing from South Alabama.

College career
McCreary played in seven games as a true freshman at Auburn in 2018. He played in all 13 games in 2019, recording 36 tackles and one interception. McCreary become a full time starter his junior year in 2020. In 10 games, he had 45 tackles and three interceptions. He returned to Auburn for his senior year in 2021, rather than enter the 2021 NFL Draft. In 2021, McCreary recorded 49 tackles, two interceptions and an SEC best 14 pass breakups.

Following his senior season, McCreary was named as a first-team All-American by both the Associated Press and ESPN.

Professional career

McCreary was drafted in the second round with the 35th overall pick in the 2022 NFL Draft. He started all 17 games in his rookie season. He finished with 84 total tackles, one interception, and eight passes defensed.

Personal life
McCreary's pregame meal is two plates of baked beans with eight packets of sugar.

References

External links
 Tennessee Titans bio
Auburn Tigers bio

2000 births
Living people
Sportspeople from Mobile, Alabama
Players of American football from Alabama
American football cornerbacks
Auburn Tigers football players
All-American college football players
Tennessee Titans players